The 2017–18 season was the 27th consecutive season in the top Ukrainian football league for Dynamo Kyiv. Dynamo competed in the Premier League, Ukrainian Cup, UEFA Champions League, UEFA Europa League and Ukrainian Super Cup.

Players

Squad information

Transfers

In

Out

Pre-season and friendlies

Competitions

Overall

Premier League

League table

Results summary

Results by round

Matches

Notes:
 Dynamo Kyiv was assigned 3–0 defeat by FFU, after they refused to play the match in Mariupol

Ukrainian Cup

Ukrainian Super Cup

UEFA Champions League

Europa League

Group stage

Knockout phase

Round of 32

Round of 16

Statistics

Appearances and goals

|-
! colspan=16 style=background:#dcdcdc; text-align:center| Goalkeepers

|-
! colspan=16 style=background:#dcdcdc; text-align:center| Defenders

|-
! colspan=16 style=background:#dcdcdc; text-align:center| Midfielders 

|-
! colspan=16 style=background:#dcdcdc; text-align:center| Forwards

|-
! colspan=16 style=background:#dcdcdc; text-align:center| Players transferred out during the season

Last updated: 19 May 2018

Goalscorers

Last updated: 19 May 2018

Clean sheets

Last updated: 19 May 2018

Disciplinary record

Last updated: 19 May 2018

References

External links
Official website

Dynamo Kyiv
FC Dynamo Kyiv seasons
Dynamo Kyiv
Dynamo Kyiv